John Roxburgh (10 November 1901 – 29 March 1977) was a Scottish footballer who played in the Football League for Aston Villa, Leicester City, Sheffield United and Stoke.

Career
Roxburgh began his career with Edinburgh Emmett before joining English non-league side Rugby Town. He impressed enough to earn a move to Leicester City where he was a regular for two seasons. He joined Aston Villa in 1922 and then moved on to Stoke. At the Victoria Ground Roxburgh played 14 matches scoring once against Stockport County in a 1–0 in February 1924. At the end of the 1923–24 season he moved on again this time to Sheffield United and then Sheffield and Leicester Normads. He was once actually selected for an England amateur international against Wales in March 1926 before his birthplace was made known to the FA. He made his Scottish debut in the 1926-27 season. Roxburgh went on to top around 80 League appearances for his four senior clubs. He appeared alongside his brother Andy for 5 games in the Leicester City senior team.

Career statistics
Source:

References

Scottish footballers
Aston Villa F.C. players
Leicester City F.C. players
Sheffield United F.C. players
Stoke City F.C. players
English Football League players
1901 births
1965 deaths
Sheffield F.C. players
Scotland amateur international footballers
Association football forwards